Walter Roger Martos Ruiz (born 2 November 1957) is a Peruvian retired military general and politician who briefly served as Prime Minister of Peru from August to November 2020, under President Martín Vizcarra's administration. He previously served as Minister of Defense from October 2019 to August 2020.

A former major-general of the Peruvian Army, Martos served in a variety of leading military positions throughout his career.

Army career
Martos was born in the northern city of Cajamarca. Following the conclusion of his high school education at the Cristo Rey Maristas School, Martos enrolled in the Chorrillos Military School, where he would graduate in 1978 with a specialization in Engineering. He attained a master's degree at the Army's Superior War College and at the Army's Scientific and Technological Institute.

He was successively Secretary General of the Army General Command; General Commander of Education and Doctrine Command of the Peruvian Army; Commander General of the Northern Military Region (2011); Chief of General Staff of the Army; and Chair of Joint Chiefs of Staff of the Armed Forces (2013).

He has also been director of the Army Language Center; Academic deputy director and director of the Military School of Chorrillos; director of the School of Engineering and the Superior School of War.

Political career

Minister of Defense (2019–2020)
On October 3, 2019, as a retired general, Martos was sworn in as Minister of Defense, as part of the cabinet led by Vicente Zeballos, of the Martín Vizcarra administration. He succeeded retired Vice Admiral Jorge Moscoso in said position, as part of the cabinet renewal following the dissolution of the Peruvian Congress four days prior.

Prime Minister  (2020)
Following the congressional denial of confidence against Pedro Cateriano's cabinet, President Martín Vizcarra appointed Martos as Prime Minister of Peru on 6 August 2020.

Into three months in office, Martos resigned alongside his cabinet following the impeachment and removal of President Vizcarra, on 9 November 2020.

References

|-

1957 births
People from Lima
Peruvian Army officers
Chorrillos Military School alumni
Prime Ministers of Peru
Defense ministers of Peru
Living people